Plagiochasma may refer to:
 Plagiochasma (echinoderm), an extinct echinoderm genus in the family Pygaulidae
 Plagiochasma (plant), a plant genus in the family Aytoniaceae